Advantage was a small galleon in the service of the English Navy Royal. She spent her career in the Channel Guard during two more attempts by Philip II of Spain to invade England. She maintained this assignment until she went to the English Channel. She was accidentally burnt in Scotland in 1613.

Advantage was the first named vessel in the English and Royal Navies.

Construction and specifications
She was built on the Thames possibly at Deptford under the guidance of Master Shipwrights Peter and Joseph Pett. She was launched in 1590. Her tonnage was between 172.8 and 216 tons.

Her gun armament was in 1603 18 guns consisting of six demi-culverines, eight sakers, two minions and two falcons. Her manning was around 100 officers and men in 1603.

Commissioned service
She was commissioned in 1599 under Captain Thomas Coverte for service with Sir Richard Leveson's Channel Guard in 1599. She was with the Channel Guard until January/February 1600. Later that year she was under Captain George Fenner then Captain Sackville Trevor in 1601 followed by Captain William Jones in 1602 for service in the English Channel.

Disposition
''Advantage was accidentally burnt in Scotland in December 1613.

Notes

Citations

References
 British Warships in the Age of Sail (1603 – 1714), by Rif Winfield, published by Seaforth Publishing, England © Rif Winfield 2009, EPUB , Chapter 4, The Fourth Rates - 'Small Ships', Vessels in service or on order at 24 March 1603, Crane Group. Advantage
 Ships of the Royal Navy, by J.J. Colledge, revised and updated by Lt-Cdr Ben Warlow and Steve Bush, published by Seaforth Publishing, Barnsley, Great Britain, © the estate of J.J. Colledge, Ben Warlow and Steve Bush 2020, EPUB , Section A (Advantage)
 The Arming and Fitting of English Ships of War 1600 - 1815, by Brian Lavery, published by US Naval Institute Press © Brian Lavery 1989, Part V Guns, Type of Guns

 

Ships of the Royal Navy
16th-century ships